Churamiti is a genus of toads endemic to Tanzania. It is monotypic and represented by a single species, Churamiti maridadi. This species is only known from its type locality in the Mamiwa-Kisara Forest Reserve in the Ukaguru Mountains. Only four specimens are known. The scientific name is derived from the Swahili words  meaning toad or frog,  meaning tree, and  meaning beautiful, for the descriptive "beautiful tree-toad".

Description
The two females in the type series measure  in snout–vent length. The head is wide, flattened, and with a snout that is blunt in profile. The eyes are protruding; the upper eyelid is glandular. The back, deep metallic yellow in colour, is smooth but has many rounded, glandular warts that extend on to the limbs and are of striking reddish-brown colour. The limbs are partly yellow, partly pinkish. The finger and toe tips are large and expanded.

Habitat and conservation
It lives arboreally. It is listed as a critically endangered species due to a restricted range and habitat loss.

References

Monotypic amphibian genera
Bufonidae
Frogs of Africa
Amphibians of Tanzania
Endemic fauna of Tanzania
Amphibians described in 2002